Hannah Montana is the soundtrack album for the first season of the television series Hannah Montana, released on October 24, 2006 by Walt Disney Records. The program itself premiered through the Disney Channel on March 24, 2006; after becoming an immediate commercial success, production on its soundtrack began the following month. Eight of its thirteen tracks are performed by the series' lead actress Miley Cyrus, and are credited to her character Hannah Montana. The groups The Click Five, Everlife, B5, and recording artist Jesse McCartney each contribute one recording, while a duet between Cyrus and her father Billy Ray Cyrus is included as the final track. Hannah Montana was reissued as a two-disc special edition on March 20, 2007. The soundtrack was further promoted during the Cheetah Girls' Party's Just Begun Tour, for which Cyrus served as an opening act, and her own Best of Both Worlds Tour. The soundtrack is primarily a pop rock record, which sees additional influences from teen pop, pop punk, and country pop musical styles. The lyrical themes revolve largely around "girl power", teen romance, and the double life that Cyrus' character lives on the program.

Hannah Montana received generally favorable reviews from music critics, who appreciated its overall production. It debuted at number one on the US Billboard 200 with first-week sales of 281,000 copies. In doing so, it became Cyrus' first number-one album, the first television soundtrack to reach the top position on the chart, and the fourth soundtrack from The Walt Disney Company to debut in the top-ten of the chart. The record has since been certified triple-platinum by the Recording Industry Association of America (RIAA), having exceeded shipments of three million copies in the United States. The soundtrack charted moderately on international record charts, having reached the top-twenty in countries including Austria, Canada, Norway, and Spain.

The series theme song "The Best of Both Worlds" was released as the lead single from Hannah Montana on March 28, 2006 on digital markets and later as a CD single. It reached number 92 on the US Billboard Hot 100. "Who Said" was released as the second single on digital platforms from the album peaking at 83 in the US. "Rockin' Around the Christmas Tree", from the Holiday Edition was released as the third single on November 12, 2007 as a digital download. "If We Were a Movie", was released as the fourth single digital platforms in 2007 and peaked at 47 in the US. "The Other Side of Me" was released as the fifth and final single on iTunes from the album peaking at 84 in the US on February 10, 2009.

Background and composition

During production of the first season of Hannah Montana, Cyrus commented that at the moment, they were focused on improving the series as much as possible, however recording a soundtrack for it was a plausible plan for the future. The series itself premiered through the Disney Channel on March 24, 2006, and became an immediate commercial success; with 5.4 million viewers, the pilot episode earned the channel the highest ratings in its history at the time. The following month, it was reported that an accompanying soundtrack and Cyrus' debut studio album had both begun production, the first of which was scheduled to be released during fall 2006. These plans were expected to capitalize on promotional efforts previously used for Hilary Duff, who had successfully transitioned from the title character of the television series Lizzie McGuire into a career in the music industry in the early 2000s.

In the series, Cyrus portrays the character Miley Stewart, a teenager who lives the secret double life as the pop star Hannah Montana. She stated that "most songs for the first season reflect the show, with Miley or Hannah making sure the other doesn't get caught or whatever," opining that the tracks provided series producers with the opportunity to "make sure that everyone understood the characters". By comparison, Cyrus described later material used by the series as "more speaking out to the fans." The record incorporates elements of teen pop, pop rock, and country pop musical styles. Cyrus performs eight of its thirteen tracks, which are credited to Hannah Montana. Her songs "The Best of Both Worlds" and "This Is the Life" describe the double life that Cyrus' character maintains, while "If We Were a Movie" and "I Got Nerve" respectively address a romantic desire and "girl power".

"Pop Princess" by The Click Five was described by Heather Phares from AllMusic as "sparkly power pop"; she also characterized "Find Yourself in You" by Everlife as "the template for Hannah's rock-edged pop". The soundtrack closes with the country pop duet "I Learned From You" between Cyrus and her father Billy Ray Cyrus, which Phares felt drew influences from recording artist Vanessa Carlton. The soundtrack was later reissued as a two-disc special edition, which saw the inclusion of the track "Nobody's Perfect", which was later featured on the following soundtrack Hannah Montana 2: Meet Miley Cyrus (2007).

Singles

The series' theme song "The Best of Both Worlds" was released as the lead single from Hannah Montana on March 28, 2006; it reached number 92 on the US Billboard Hot 100. Several tracks from the soundtrack charted in the United States.

"Who Said" was released as the second single on July 11, 2006.

A cover of "Rockin' Around the Christmas Tree" that appears only as the holiday version bonus track was released as the third single on November 6, 2007.

"If We Were a Movie" was released as the fourth single in 2007.

The remix of "The Other Side of Me" was released as the fifth and final single from the album on February 10, 2009.

Other songs 
"I Got Nerve" charted at number 67 on the charts. "Pumpin' Up the Party", "Who Said", and "The Other Side of Me" respectively peaked at numbers 81, 83, and 84, while "Just Like You" entered at number 99. After being reissued, "Nobody's Perfect" peaked at number 27 on the Billboard Hot 100.

Promotion

Cyrus' first live performances were during The Cheetah Girls' Party's Just Begun Tour in 2006 and 2007. She performed as Hannah Montana, and served as a "rotating" opening act in place of recording artists Vanessa Hudgens, Jordan Pruitt and groups Everlife and T-Squad. Cyrus later embarked on the nationwide Best of Both Worlds Tour in 2007 and 2008. It primarily served as a promotional tool for the recently released record Hannah Montana 2: Meet Miley Cyrus (2007); however, "Just Like You", "Pumpin' Up the Party", "I Got Nerve", and "The Best of Both Worlds" from the original soundtrack were included in its set list. The tour proved commercially successful, having grossed $54 million by its conclusion, while its 2008 film adaption Hannah Montana & Miley Cyrus: Best of Both Worlds Concert earned $63 million. The latter was released as a Walmart-exclusive CD/DVD set, titled Best of Both Worlds Concert, in March 2008.

Critical reception

Hannah Montana received generally favorable reviews from music critics, who appreciated its overall production. Writing for AllMusic, Heather Phares enjoyed Cyrus' deliveries of "cute, well-written songs", and added that the overall project was "sweet, starry-eyed, [and] utterly charming". Jennifer Axman from Common Sense Media shared a similar sentiment, appreciating its "upbeat girl-power messages" and distinguishing "I Learned from You" as a stand-out track for its inspirational lyrics ("I learned from you that I do not crumble / I learned from you that strength is something you choose /.../ There is no question that's a lesson I learned from you"). MSN Music gave the record a 3.5 out of 5 stars, and listed it as an "essential album". However, Chris Willman provided a more mixed review, commenting that Cyrus appeared to "mimic Avril, Ashlee, and Britney simultaneously", and felt that the concept of leading a double life was "a nice fantasy for Brangelina, but a weird one to push on little girls." David Hiltbrand was also critical of the record, stating that its "generic pop" would irritate adult listeners, but acknowledged that it was "slickly executed" for appealing to its younger audience.

Commercial performance
During the week of October 25, initial sales projections recognized Hannah Montana, The Black Parade by My Chemical Romance, and Once Again by John Legend as the most-likely records that would reach number one on the US Billboard 200. On November 1, Hannah Montana officially debuted at number one with first-week sales of 281,000 copies, making a difference of 41,000 units more than The Black Parade, which charted in second place. In doing so, the record became the first television soundtrack to debut in the peak position and fourth soundtrack from The Walt Disney Company to debut in the top-ten of the chart. It remained at number one the following week with sales of 203,000 copies. Furthermore, the soundtrack became Cyrus' first of five number-one albums in the United States to date, having been followed by Hannah Montana 2: Meet Miley Cyrus (2007), Breakout (2008), Hannah Montana: The Movie (soundtrack) (2009), and Bangerz (2013). It was eventually certified triple-platinum by the Recording Industry Association of America (RIAA) for exceeding shipments of three million units. As of January 2014, Hannah Montana has sold 3,736,000 copies in the United States, becoming the second best-selling television soundtrack behind High School Musical with 4,878,000 copies. Internationally, Hannah Montana charted moderately on national record charts. It peaked at number 10 on the Canadian Albums Chart, and was certified gold by Music Canada. The record charted at number 23 on the Top 100 Mexico chart, where it was later recognized with gold certification. In Europe, the soundtrack reached number
14 on the Spanish PROMUSICAE. It additionally earned a gold certification in the United Kingdom. As of 2014, the soundtrack has sold 3.74 million million copies in the United States.

Track listing
All songs performed by Hannah Montana, unless otherwise noted.

Charts

Weekly charts

Year-end charts

Decade-end charts

Sales and certifications

Release history

References

2006 soundtrack albums
Albums produced by Matthew Gerrard
Albums produced by Rock Mafia
Hannah Montana albums
Walt Disney Records soundtracks
Pop punk albums by American artists